The AFF Player of the Year is an association football award presented to the best footballer in ASEAN region. The inaugural award was launched in 2013 and run every 2 year.

Winner (Men)

Winner (Women)

References

ASEAN Football Federation
Asian football trophies and awards
Asian AFF
Awards established in 2013
2013 establishments in Southeast Asia